Kirill Fyodorovich Dontsov (born 21 December 2001) is a Russian football player. He plays for FC Avangard Kursk.

Club career
He made his debut in the Russian Premier League for FC Rotor Volgograd on 27 September 2020 in a game against FC Rubin Kazan.

References

External links
 
 
 

2001 births
Sportspeople from Volgograd
Living people
Russian footballers
Association football defenders
FC Rotor Volgograd players
FC Dynamo Makhachkala players
FC Avangard Kursk players
Russian Premier League players
Russian First League players